Allahabad South is a constituency of the Uttar Pradesh Legislative Assembly covering the city of Allahabad South in the Allahabad district of Uttar Pradesh, India.
  
Allahabad South is one of five assembly constituencies in the Allahabad Lok Sabha constituency. Since 2008, this assembly constituency is numbered 263 amongst 403 constituencies.

Currently this seat belongs to Bharatiya Janta Party candidate Nand Gopal Gupta Nandi who won in last Assembly election of 2017 Uttar Pradesh Legislative Elections defeating Samajwadi Party candidate Parvez Ahmad by a margin of 28,587 votes.

Members of Legislative Assembly

Election results

2022

2017

2012

References

External links
 

Assembly constituencies of Uttar Pradesh
Politics of Allahabad